Whatever Happened to Slade is the seventh studio album by the British rock group Slade. It was released on 21 March 1977 by Barn Records, but did not enter any national album chart. By the time of the album's release, Slade's popularity was waning as were their record sales, which they acknowledged in the album's title. The glam rock movement, with which Slade was associated, had died, and the careers of other glam rock artists such as Mud, Gary Glitter and Sweet had also died. In Britain, where Slade had traditionally been most popular, the fashion of the day was punk rock. With this album, Slade firmly stood its ground as a straight rock group, and gone were their "glam" statements of the early decade.

The album was met with critical praise and support from the English punk uprising. Nevertheless, the record was a commercial failure and the band's financial woes continued. For many years, the album was a much sought-after collector's item amongst fans. However, the album is available today via CD remaster from 2007 and download. In later years, the album became a popular trade amongst American musicians developing what would be known as "grunge" as both Billy Corgan (Smashing Pumpkins) and Kurt Cobain (Nirvana) cited the album as influential. The album was voted No. 1 of the top three Slade albums in the Slade Fan Club Poll of 1979.

Background
By 1975, Slade felt their commercial success had peaked in Great Britain and Europe. At manager Chas Chandler's suggestion, the band agreed to move to the United States, the only major territory that the band had yet to crack. The band held out in the US for almost two years, recording the soul-influenced Nobody's Fools (1976). Although the band did not achieve significant airplay and record sales in the US, their reputation as a reliable and exciting live rock act was enhanced and the band felt rejuvenated.

Slade returned to the UK in August 1976 to face the UK music business much changed from when they had left. Punk rock had now exploded and had become the dominant influence on youth culture and the music press. Despite Slade's reputation as one of the great high energy bands of their day, in this environment Slade had become irrelevant. Regardless, Slade were determined that they were now a better live act than ever and refused to call it a day. The band began recording their seventh studio album in August. According to the Slade Fan Club, the band hoped to record a total of 16 tracks and pick the best to release on the album.

In January 1977, the band's released the upcoming album's only single "Gypsy Roadhog". However, after performing the song on the children's television show Blue Peter, complaints about the song's drug references led to the BBC banning the record. As a result, the single stalled at No. 48. Whatever Happened to Slade was released in March but failed to chart.

Recalling the album in the 1984 biography Feel the Noize!, bassist Jim Lea said: "It was a heavy metal album. It was a mistake and I was against that title." Lead vocalist Noddy Holder said in his 1999 biography Who's Crazee Now?: "Whatever Happened to Slade was much rockier than Nobody's Fools. It was a return to our original sound". In a 2009 interview answering fan questions, drummer Don Powell was asked which Slade album he would recommend to a new listener as the "definitive Slade studio album". He said: "Whatever Happened to Slade because at that particular time we had nothing to lose."

During a 2017 live question and answer event with Lea at the Robin 2 club, Lea spoke of the album: "The Whatever Happened to Slade album came out of us touring in America. There were a lot of bands over there that had got this guitar identity. There was the Allman Brothers with Duane Allman, there was ZZ Top coming along, and the guitar player was a big thing. So we started coming up with Whatever Happened to Slade and I thought it was important we had the guitar breaks. I worked them out and then we went through it. Dave did all the playing on the record."

Music

After the varied sound of their previous album, Nobody's Fools (1976), which prominently featured a "Californian" sound and influences from soul music, Whatever Happened to Slade presents a "straight" rock sound, a sound which would have helped it to settle into the punk rock-focused British music industry of the time had it had more success. AllMusic also noted the album as sounding similar to early-Kiss, but noted "its still pure Slade, though". They also noted "the songs and playing [on the album] are pretty much out of sight, with monster riffs and a different production style."

The first track on the album, "Be", became popular in Slade's live sets, featuring on the band's subsequent live album Slade Alive, Vol. 2 (1978). For a fan club newsletter in 1979, bassist Jim Lea spoke of the track, saying "songs like "Be" are hardly concise, they're clever, but hardly the sing-along down at the pub type song." AllMusic described the song as being "unlike any other the band had done".

"Gypsy Roadhog", the album's single is a tale of the exploits of an American cocaine dealer. The song featured a country rock influence, taken from Slade's touring in America. "One Eyed Jacks with Moustaches" became popular in Slade's live set, featuring on the subsequent live album Slade Alive, Vol. 2 (1978). AllMusic said the song "sounds like classic Slade, but once again, radio wouldn't touch it." "Dead Men Tell No Tales" features a slower tempo and has lyrics based on the 1949 gangster film White Heat, starring James Cagney.

Release and promotion

There had been no new release from Slade since the "Nobody's Fool" single had been lifted from the Nobody's Fools album in April 1976 to commercial failure. The first that was heard of Slade in 1977 was the single "Gypsy Roadhog". After the single was banned and stalled on the UK Singles Chart, the album that followed didn't have much commercial chance after that. Titled by Chandler after a piece of graffiti spotted painted on a London bridge, Whatever Happened to Slade, while intended as a defiant, ironic comment on their absence from UK shores, was more likely received as a virtual admission of how far the group's star had fallen, and few people, except perhaps a mere fraction of their old fan base, was in the mood to contradict them.

Whatever Happened to Slade received no airplay and very little press. It failed to chart on any national chart, including the UK Albums Chart, and became the group's lowest-selling LP to date. However, those faithful few who took the trouble were amazed by the record. Described as "the heaviest, dirtiest (in all senses), most decadent Slade music ever made", Whatever Happened to Slade was described as making "Gypsy Roadhog" sound like "The Teddy Bear's Picnic" and remains many Slade connoisseurs' favourite of all their albums. It was also influential on the grunge and alternative rock genres, with both Billy Corgan of The Smashing Pumpkins and Kurt Cobain of Nirvana citing the album as influential.

The album was remastered by Tim Turan at Turan Audio for CD release in 2007 by Salvo Records, a subsidiary of Union Square Productions, as part of a series of Slade CD remasters known as the "Feel the Noize" remasters. The liner notes of the new edition describe the album as "underrated".

Critical reception

Upon release, Sheila Prophet of Record Mirror felt the album was "worth giving a spin". She felt most tracks were "solid, rocking numbers" but not as "distinctive" as the band's earlier hits. She added: "Part of the problem is that they seem to be trying too hard – laying everything on, instead of sticking with simplicity. Noddy's voice still sounds great, and Dave turns in some pretty nifty guitar, but there's just too much of everything." Pete Makowski of New Musical Express described the album as "high energy on a primeval scale", with "strong tunes", "lotsa potential singles" and "interesting" lyrical content. Tony Ciarochi of Fairbanks Daily News-Miner said the album "definitely packs punch", displaying "fairly basic rock 'n' roll" but with "British humor and sarcasm", which makes it a "refreshing change from some of the more bland sledgehammer rock grounds dominant in America."

In a retrospective review, Geoff Ginsberg of AllMusic felt the album had "a bit of the Hotter Than Hell, early-Kiss sound", but was "still pure Slade". He described the songs as having "monster riffs and a different production style", concluding "this is a great record". Joe Geesin of Get Ready to Rock! said the album largely removed the "glam and the kitsch" with "rough Slade style rock'n'roll", adding "there's some great rough guitar". In 2010, Classic Rock considered the album "superior: reputation cementing" and wrote: "Whatever Happened to Slade tempers their established qualities with righteous indignation." Colin Harper of Record Collector felt the album "showed muscle", had US stadium boogie as a "prime influence" and featured Holder's "least charming lyrics".

In 2016, Nicholas Pell of LA Weekly ranked the album at No. 14 on his "20 Greatest Classic Rock Albums" list. He summarised: "This isn't just the template for grunge, it's everything good about hair metal 10 years early." He added that "Gypsy Roadhog" and "One Eyed Jacks With Moustaches" as "undeniable rock ragers", while he felt "Dogs of Vengeance" is "what is missing from classic rock radio".

Track listing

Personnel
Slade
Noddy Holder – lead vocals, rhythm guitar
Dave Hill – lead guitar, backing vocals
Jim Lea – bass, backing vocals
Don Powell – drums, percussion

Additional personnel
Chas Chandler – producer
Paul Hardiman – engineer
Gered Mankowitz – photography
Wade Woode Associates – artwork
Jo Mirowski – art direction

References

Slade albums
Whatever Happened to Slade
Albums produced by Chas Chandler